Sir Richard Arkwright's Masson Mill is a water-powered cotton spinning mill situated on the west bank of the River Derwent in Matlock Bath, Derbyshire in England. This mill was built in 1783.  It forms part of the Derwent Valley Mills, a World Heritage Site.  Nearby is Willersley Castle, the house Richard Arkwright built for himself within the parish of Matlock.

History

Following the invention of the flying shuttle for weaving cotton in 1733 the demand for spun cotton increased enormously in England. Machines for carding and spinning had already been developed but were inefficient and the cotton produced was of insufficient quality to form the warp of the weave. In 1769, Arkwright patented a water frame  to use the extra power of a water mill. His first mill was the Cromford Mill in 1771. Masson Mill is the third, and was built close by to take advantage of the greater water flow from the River Derwent.

Constructed in brick on a gritstone with stone quoins and window dressings, the original 21 bay 5 storey building was 43.8 metres long and 8.4 metres wide. The staircase and ancillary services were in a central projection leaving production floors uncluttered, This was an important advance in mill architecture. The mill was powered by a single waterwheel which, by 1801, had been replaced by two, a system which continued (with replacement wheels by Wren and Bennet in 1847) until turbines were installed in 1928. In its original form, the mill was built with a high parapet which concealed a low pitch roof but probably at the same time as the second wheel was added c. 1800, the roof was raised, as a result of which the mill acquired a usable sixth storey.

A weir was built across the Derwent to build up a head for Arkwright's Mill and a pre-existing paper mill. It is unusual in that it is convex in form, rather than the usual concave.

Adams, in his "Gem of the Peak"' (1840) said that Masson Mill 'is replete with the improved machinery employed in making cotton thread'. He also described the night time view as 'exceedingly imposing. The spacious mill, with its hundred lights reflecting on the river and the thick foliage, mingling the din of wheels with the noise of the waterfall'.

Buildings were added to the north and west of the mill by c.1835, some of which were subsequently demolished. In 1911, 1928, and more recently in 1998, extensions were added in Accrington brick. The mill chimney dates from 1900, and this and the engine house were the work of Stott and Sons, the famous mill architects.

In 1897 Masson Mill became part of the English Sewing Cotton Company. Kelly's (1908) Directory stated that 'the Masson Cotton Mills .... give employment to many of the inhabitants' [of Matlock Bath]. By 1922 the Masson Cotton Mills were 'now the property of Sir Richard Arkwright and Co. Limited (branch of the English Sewing Cotton Co. Limited)' and the mill continued to a major employer in the area. The mill has been extensively repaired and restored recently. The mill is now home to a museum and a retail village.

Hydroelectric power

The mill has had hydroelectric generators installed in 1995 which generate 240 kW.

Gallery

References

External links

Sir Richard Arkwright’s Masson Mills - official site

Textile mills in Derbyshire
Cotton mills
Former textile mills in the United Kingdom
Museums in Derbyshire
Industry museums in England
Textile museums in the United Kingdom
Watermills in Derbyshire
Hydroelectric power stations in England
Industrial Revolution in England
Spinning
Textile mills completed in the 18th century
Grade II* listed buildings in Derbyshire
Grade II* listed industrial buildings
Industrial archaeological sites in England